Thomas Kevin (1927 – 19 October 2009) was an Irish hurler who played for the Tipperary senior team.

Born in Boherlahen, County Tipperary, Kevin first arrived on the inter-county scene at the age of seventeen when he first linked up with the Tipperary minor team before later joining the junior side. He joined the senior panel during the 1951 championship. Kevin was a member of the team for just one year, however, during that time he won one All-Ireland medal and one Munster medal as a non-playing substitute.

At club level Kevin enjoyed a lengthy career with Boherlahan–Dualla.

Kevin retired from inter-county hurling following the conclusion of the 1951 championship.

In retirement from playing Kevin became involved in team management and coaching. He was a selector with the Boherlahen-Dualla senior team on a number of occasions.

Honours

Player

Boherlahan–Dualla
Mid Tipperary Senior Hurling Championship (1): 1953 (c)

Tipperary
All-Ireland Senior Hurling Championship (1): 1951 (sub)
Munster Senior Hurling Championship (1): 1951 (sub)

References

1927 births
2009 deaths
Boherlahan-Dualla hurlers
Tipperary inter-county hurlers
Hurling selectors